Lethal Weapon is a 1987 American action film.

Lethal Weapon may also refer to:

Arts and entertainment
 Lethal Weapon (franchise), a media franchise spawned by the 1987 film
 Lethal Weapon 2 (1989)
 Lethal Weapon 3 (1992)
 Lethal Weapon 4 (1998)
 Lethal Weapon (TV series), based on the film series
 Lethal Weapon (soundtrack), soundtrack to the 1987 film
 Lethal Weapon (video game), based on the film series
 "Lethal Weapon" (song), a 1989 hip-hop single by Ice-T

Other uses
 Deadly weapon, an item that can inflict mortal or great bodily harm
 Lethal autonomous weapon, a type of autonomous military robot
 Lethal Weapon (professional wrestling), Japanese professional wrestling stable